Andrew Quinn (born 25 May 1983) is an Irish hurler who played as a right corner-forward for the Clare senior hurling team.

Andrew Quinn's underage career with St Flannan's College included winning Munster under-15 hurling and football, Munster under-16 hurling and football, Dean Ryan and Frewen Cups, and won two Dr Harty Cups and one All-Ireland in 2000 and denied a third Harty Cup in 2001.

At club he won Minor A championship in 2000.  He is also a county club championship medalist with Tulla. He contributed high scores on the path to final scoring 1-43 and contested Munster Club and Clare Cup finals after. At the college level he collected a Fitzgibbon Medal with Ul.

In 2007 when Tulla reached the final of the county championship for the first time in almost seventy-five years. Crusheen, a team which had never won the title, provided the opposition. Quinn's brother Brian scored a crucial goal as Tulla secured a 1–7 to 0–9 victory. His brother Mark played at centre back and another brother Karl was a substitute. The victory gave Quinn a Clare Senior Hurling Championship medal.

Inter-county

Quinn first came to prominence on the inter-county scene at under-age levels with Clare playing at all levels. He played minor and under-21 for three years.

He made his senior debut for Clare in a National Hurling League game against Meath in 2002 and later became a regular impact substitute during the subsequent championship campaign. In spite of losing their opening game, Clare surprised the hurling world by qualifying for the All-Ireland final. Quinn came on as a substitute once again as his side put up a good fight against Kilkenny. A combined tally of 2-13 for Henry Shefflin and D. J. Carey gave "the Cats" a seven-point victory.  In 2003 he started at full forward in Clare's Munster championship win over Tipperary scoring 1–2.

Quinn continued to line out with Clare for the next few seasons contesting a league final in 2005 and an all Ireland semifinal later that year, only to lose to a late Cork rally. He called time on his inter-county career following the team's exit from the 2007 championship and went on to win a championship with Tulla.

References

1983 births
Living people
Tulla (Clare) hurlers
Clare inter-county hurlers
People educated at St Flannan's College